Bernie Baum (October 13, 1929 – August 28, 1993) was a songwriter who worked extensively with Elvis Presley. He grew up in New York City and later worked with Harvey Zimmerman (better known as Bill Giant) and Florence Kaye. The majority of their songs were used in Presley's musicals. He and his two collaborators also wrote a theme music package for the NBC Weekend radio service called "Monitor" in 1965. Their work was also credited in the American version of Osamu Tezuka's anime Kimba the White Lion (1965). He had a #1 Hit with his song "Music! Music! Music!", Teresa Brewer's B side recording  which unexpectedly took off, selling over a million copies and becoming Teresa's signature song. with  His other works included:

 Roustabout
 (You're the) Devil in Disguise
 Viva Las Vegas (The title track was written by Doc Pomus and Mort Shuman.)
 Fun in Acapulco
 Girls! Girls! Girls!
 It Happened at the World's Fair
 Kissin' Cousins
 Girl Happy
 Harum Scarum
 Frankie and Johnny
 Paradise, Hawaiian Style
 Spinout
 Easy Come, Easy Go
 Double Trouble
 Live a Little, Love a Little
 "Music! Music! Music!"

References

External links

Songwriters from New York (state)
1993 deaths
1929 births
Musicians from New York City
20th-century American composers